Wormholes: Essays and Occasional Writings is a book containing writings from four decades by the English author John Fowles. It was published in 1998. Most of the contents are short, non-fiction pieces that had been written for various purposes since 1963, including forewords to other authors' books, and pieces written for science journals or other periodicals.

References

1998 books
Books by John Fowles
English-language books
Essay collections
Henry Holt and Company books